Hunan University of Humanities, Science and Technology (HUHST), established in 1978, is a state-owned provincial university of higher education approved by the Chinese Ministry of Education. It is located in Loudi, a newly built city in the central part of Hunan province.

Academics
 Department of Political Science and Law
 Department of Chinese Language and Literature
 Department of Foreign Languages
 Department of Economic Management
 Department of Education Science
 Department of Physical Science and Information Engineering
 Department of Music
 Department of Art
 Department of Mathematics and Economic
 Department of Electromechanical Engineering
 Department of Chemistry and Materials Science
 Department of Information Science and Engineering
 Department of Physical Education
 Department of Life Science

Library collections
Hunan University of Humanities, Science and Technology's total collection amounts to more than 1,12 million items.

Campus and Facilities 
The university occupies an area coverage of about 700,000 m2 (1,050 Chinese acres), including 356,000 m2 constructed campus buildings. The collection in the library includes 800,000 books, over 1,400 Chinese and foreign periodicals, 140,000 e-books and 6  academic periodical databases.

Disciplines and Courses 
The university is divided into 16 faculties and 15 research centers. It offers  undergraduate courses in the arts, sciences, technology, education, business, management, law, and agriculture.

Staff  and students
Of its 892 staff members, there are 585 full-time teachers, including 1 Academician of Chinese Engineering Academy (the Honorary President of HUHST). There are 10,800 current full-time students, 5,000 part-time adult students and around 40,000 alumni.

Activities 
The university publishes  The Journal of Hunan University of Humanities, Science and Technology. It has academic relationships with foreign universities from the US, UK, Australia, Singapore and Thailand.

References

External links

 
   
 4 International Colleges & Universities

Educational institutions established in 1978
Universities and colleges in Hunan
1978 establishments in China